Barafundle is the fourth album by Welsh psychedelic folk band Gorky's Zygotic Mynci, which was released 7 April 1997 in the United Kingdom. The album's title comes from the name of a beach in Pembrokeshire, Wales.

Songs are often sung in both Welsh and English, and the album's influences range from twee-pop to traditional folk music. Lynn Childs, father of singer Euros and violinist Megan, plays shawm and other traditional instruments on the album's occasional medieval interludes (for example, on "Starmoonsun").

Singles
Two singles were released from the album. The first single, "Patio Song", was released in late 1996 and became the band's highest charting single in the UK, peaking at #41 in early 1997. The song also ranked #8 on John Peel's 1996 Festive Fifty countdown.

The second single, "Diamond Dew", reached #42 on the UK Singles Chart in mid-1997. A contemporaneous non-album single, "Young Girls & Happy Endings", was also released in 1997 and appeared as a bonus track on some American copies of the album.

Track listing 
All songs written by Euros Childs unless otherwise stated.

 "Diamond Dew" (Childs/James) – 2:50
 "The Barafundle Bumbler" – 1:53
 "Starmoonsun" (Lawrence) – 3:04
 "Patio Song" – 2:43
 "Better Rooms..." – 3:46
 "Heywood Lane" (Lawrence/Childs) – 2:52
 "Pen Gwag Glas" – 3:59
 "Bola Bola" – 1:53
 "Cursed, Coined and Crucified" (Lawrence) – 2:27
 "Sometimes the Father Is the Son" (James) – 3:21
 "Meirion Wyllt" – 2:48
 "The Wizard and the Lizard" (Lawrence/Childs) – 1:58
 "Miniature Kingdoms" (Lawrence/Childs) – 4:17
 "Dark Night" – 4:49
 "Hwyl Fawr I Pawb" (M. Childs) – 1:48
 "Wordless Song" – 3:20
 "Young Girls & Happy Endings" - 2:25 (US Bonus Track)

Personnel 

Euros Childs - vocals, piano, organ, synths, electric piano, harmonium, guitar (5)
John Lawrence - guitar, vocals, bass (1,2), jaw harp (1,12), electric piano (3), organ (3,13), recorder (3,5,12), piano (9), bodhran (3)
Megan Childs - violin, vocals, viola, organ (9), piano (15)
Richard James - bass, guitar, piano (10), organ (10), synth (4)
Euros Rowlands - drums, percussion
Gorwel Owen - piano (2,16), synth (7)
Fiona Owen - vocals (6,11,14)
Lynn Childs - shawm, crumhorn
Tom Rawlins - shawm, crumhorn, hurdy-gurdy
Stuart Evans - shawm, flute
Andrew Frizzell - trombone, flute
Simon James - sax, flute
Martin Smith - trumpet, marching horn

References

External links

Barafundle at YouTube (streamed copy where licensed)
 Barafundle page on Euros Childs's official website

1997 albums
Gorky's Zygotic Mynci albums
Fontana Records albums
Albums produced by Gorwel Owen